The Gananda Central School District is a public school district in New York State that serves approximately 900 students in the master-planned development of Gananda, which is in the towns of Macedon and Walworth in Wayne County with a staff of 200 (112 teachers and 90 support staff) and an annual  budget of approximately $24 million.

The average class size is 20 students (all grades). The student-teacher ratio is 14:1.

Dr. Shawn Van Scoy is Superintendent of Schools.

The district motto is "Success for All".

Board of education
The Board of Education (BOE) consists of 7 members, 7 who serve rotating 3-year terms. Elections are held each May for board members and to vote on the School District Budget.

Board members (2022) are:
Greg Giles- President
Patty Walker- Vice President
Lisa Finnegan
Shauna Phillips
Bill Buchko
Mike Cardarelli
Robin Vogt
Leslie Ferrante - District Clerk

History
The Gananda Central School District opened its doors to 108 students in 1974 and has grown since then as the population of suburban Rochester has grown.

Schools
The district operates three schools, all located in the town of Walworth.

Elementary schools
Richard Mann Elementary School (K-5), Principal - Katy Lumb

Middle schools
Gananda Middle School (6-8), Principal - Elliot Butt

High schools
Ruben A. Cirillo High School (9-12), Principal - Matthew Mahoney

Performance
The district's 89% graduation rate exceeds the State Standard of 55%.

References

External links

New York State School Boards Association

School districts in New York (state)
Education in Wayne County, New York
School districts established in 1974